Argyarctia is a genus of tiger moths in the family Erebidae. The moths are found in Yunnan (China) and in Taiwan.

Species
Argyarctia fuscobasalis (Matsumura, 1930)
Argyarctia reikoae (Kishida, 1984)

Subgenus Fangalphaea Dubatolov & Kishida, 2007 
Argyarctia sericeipennis (Rothschild, 1933)

References
 , 2007: Review of the genus Argyarctia Kôda (Lepidoptera, Arctiidae). Euroasian Entomological Journal 6 (1): 81-84.
Natural History Museum Lepidoptera generic names catalog

Spilosomina
Moth genera